Harold Darling may refer to:
Harold Gordon Darling of J. Darling and Son, grain merchants
Harold Darling was the pen name of Welleran Poltarnees